Carterton Community College is a coeducational secondary school located in Carterton in the English county of Oxfordshire.

It is a community school administered by Oxfordshire County Council. The school offers GCSEs, BTECs and OCR Nationals as programmes of study for pupils.

In 2007, former headteacher Alan Klee was found guilty of bullying staff and misconduct while at Carterton Community College. Klee resigned from Carterton Community College in 2003.

The school won the School Library Association Library Design Award in 2013.

References

External links
Carterton Community College official website

Secondary schools in Oxfordshire
Community schools in Oxfordshire
Carterton, Oxfordshire